NOAA Ship Albatross IV (R 342), originally BCF Albatross IV, was a fisheries research ship in commission in the United States Fish and Wildlife Services Bureau of Commercial Fisheries from 1963 to 1970 and in the National Oceanic and Atmospheric Administration (NOAA) from 1970 to 2008.

Construction and characteristics

Albatross IV was built at Southern Shipbuilding in Slidell, Louisiana. She was launched in April 1962.

The ship had a total of 38 bunk spaces. Between the crew and officers mess rooms, the ship could seat 21 for meals. She carried a complement of 21–4 NOAA Corps officers, 1 civilian officer, and 16 crew (including 3 licensed engineers—and in addition could accommodate up to 14 scientists.

Her deck equipment featured four winches, one boom crane, an A-frame, a J-frame, and a portable gantry. Each of the winches serves a specialized function ranging from trawling and dredging to hydrographic surveys.

In support of her primary mission of fishery and living marine resource research for the National Marine Fisheries Service (NMFS) division of NOAA, the ship had shallow- and deep-water echo sounders, a fishfinder, and an Acoustic Doppler Current Profiler (ADCP). Additional scientific equipment included a thermosalinograph and a fluorometer. She had  of laboratory space with specialty labs for plankton and oceanographic chemistry. A  launch was available for utility or rescue operations.

US government service
BCF Albatross IV was commissioned into service in the U.S. Fish and Wildlife Services Bureau of Commercial Fisheries on May 9, 1963. When NOAA was established on 3 October 1970 and took over the Bureaus assets, she became part of the NOAA fleet, redesignated NOAAS Albatross IV (R 342).

Based at Woods Hole, Massachusetts, Albatross IV conducted fisheries and living marine resources research off the northeastern coast of the United States.

On May 12, 1986, shipyard workers were working in Albatross IVs marine sanitation device compartment when one of them accidentally set off the compartments fixed carbon dioxide firefighting system. Although the other workers escaped, one man, Kelly Prince, passed out in the compartment. He would have suffocated, but three members of the ships crew – NOAA Corps Lieutenant Dean Smehil, civilian third assistant engineer Daniel J. Parry, and the ships executive officer – put on Scott air packs and crawled into the very tight compartment. In moments, Smehil and Parry dragged the unconscious Prince from the compartment to safety, saving his life. For their heroism, Smehil and Parry received the Department of Commerce Gold Medal in 1986.

Albatros IV was decommissioned on 20 November 2008.

Later service
After withdrawal from NOAAS service, Albatross IV was sold to Maritech Engineering and Marine Project Services, an international firm based in Athens, Greece, and later transferred to its US affiliate, Marpro LLC, retaining the same name.

In 2013 Albatross IV was sold to the Autonomous University of Tamaulipas, Mexico, renamed UAT-1 CIDIPORT, and based at the Caribbean port of Tampico.  She is operated by the Centro de Investigación y Desarrollo en Ingenieria Portuaria, Maritima y Costera (CIDIPORT)(tr. Center for Research and Development of Coastal, Ocean and Port Engineering) The ship was commissioned in May 2014 by Egidio Torre Cantú, governor of Tamaulipas State.

See also
 NOAA ships and aircraft

Notes

References
Prézelin, Bernard, and A. D. Baker III, eds. The Naval Institute Guide to Combat Fleets of the World 1990/1991: Their Ships, Aircraft, and Armament. Annapolis, Maryland: United States Naval Institute, 1990. .
NOAA History, A Science Odyssey: Hall of Honor: Commerce Medals Presented for Lifesaving and the Protection of Property 1955–2000

External links
 
 

Ships of the National Oceanic and Atmospheric Administration
Ships of the United States Fish and Wildlife Service
Ships built in Slidell, Louisiana
1962 ships
Maritime incidents in 1986